The Statute Law (Repeals) Act 1971 (c 52) is an Act of the Parliament of the United Kingdom.

It implemented recommendations contained in the third report on statute law revision, by the Law Commission.

This Act was repealed for by Group 1 of Part IX of Schedule 1 to the Statute Law (Repeals) Act 1998.

The enactments which were repealed (whether for the whole or any part of the United Kingdom) by this Act were repealed so far as they extended to the Isle of Man on 25 July 1991.

See also
Statute Law (Repeals) Act

References
Halsbury's Statutes,
The Public General Acts and Church Assembly Measures 1971. HMSO. London. 1972.
John Burke (General editor). Current Law Statutes Annotated 1971. Sweet & Maxwell, Stevens & sons. London. W Green & son. Edinburgh. 1971.
HL Deb vol 314, cols 1123 to 1127, vol 320, cols 715 to 737, HC Deb vol 821, cols 103 to 106.

United Kingdom Acts of Parliament 1971